Phlogiellus is a genus of tarantulas that was first described by Reginald Innes Pocock in 1897. They are found throughout Asia and Papua New Guinea, including Indonesia, the Philippines, Papua New Guinea, China, Myanmar, Malaysia, Borneo, Thailand, the Solomon Islands and Taiwan. Phlogiellus is part Latin and part Greek, the first part being "φλóξ  φλoγóϛ", meaning flame, the second part being "ellus" which is a latin diminutive suffix.

Diagnosis 
The can be distinguished thanks to the scopulae on tarsi 1 and 4, which were divided. There is also a stridulating organ present but reduced. They also own thin and elongated chelicerate strikers, which are pallid in color. Their size is also smaller than most other tarantulas.

Species
 it contains twenty-six species and one subspecies, found in Asia, on the Solomon Islands, and in Papua New Guinea:
Phlogiellus aper (Simon, 1891) – Indonesia (Java)
Phlogiellus atriceps Pocock, 1897 (type) – Indonesia (Java)
Phlogiellus baeri (Simon, 1877) – Philippines
Phlogiellus bicolor Strand, 1911 – Papua New Guinea (New Britain)
Phlogiellus bogadeki Nunn, West & von Wirth, 2016 – China (Hong Kong)
Phlogiellus brevipes (Thorell, 1897) – Myanmar
Phlogiellus bundokalbo (Barrion & Litsinger, 1995) – Philippines
Phlogiellus daweiensis Sivayyapram & Warrit, 2020 - Myanmar 
Phlogiellus inermis (Ausserer, 1871) – Malaysia to Indonesia (Lombok)
Phlogiellus insulanus (Hirst, 1909) – Indonesia (Sulawesi)
Phlogiellus i. borneoensis (Schmidt, 2015) – Borneo
Phlogiellus insularis (Simon, 1877) – Philippines
Phlogiellus jiaxiangi Lin & Li, 2021 - China
Phlogiellus johnreylazoi Nunn, West & von Wirth, 2016 – Philippines (Palawan Is.)
Phlogiellus longipalpus Chomphuphuang, Smith, Wongvilas, Sivayyapram, Songsangchote & Warrit, 2017 – Thailand
Phlogiellus moniqueverdezae Nunn, West & von Wirth, 2016 – Thailand
Phlogiellus mutus (Giltay, 1935) – Philippines
Phlogiellus nebulosus (Rainbow, 1899) – Solomon Is.
Phlogiellus obscurus (Hirst, 1909) – Malaysia (Borneo)
Phlogiellus ornatus (Thorell, 1897) – Myanmar
Phlogiellus orophilus (Thorell, 1897) – Myanmar
Phlogiellus pelidnus Nunn, West & von Wirth, 2016 – Malaysia (Borneo)
Phlogiellus quanyui Lin, Li & Chen, 2021 - China (Hainan)
Phlogiellus raveni Sivayyapram & Warrit, 2020 - Philippines (Cebu)  
Phlogiellus subinermis (Giltay, 1934) – Southeast Asia
Phlogiellus watasei (Kishida, 1920) – Taiwan
Phlogiellus xinping (Zhu & Zhang, 2008) – China

Formerly included:

 Phlogiellus kwebaburdeos Barrion-Dupo, Barrion & Rasalan, 2015 → Orphnaecus kwebaburdeos

Phlogiellus lucubrans (L. Koch, 1874) → Selenocosmia crassipes
Phlogiellus subarmatus (Thorell, 1891) → Chilobrachys subarmatus

See also
 List of Theraphosidae species

References

Theraphosidae genera
Spiders of Asia
Taxa named by R. I. Pocock
Theraphosidae